Sayyed Muhammad Kazim ʻAssar (born 1302 AH/1884-85 AD; died Tehran, 19 Dey 1353 Š. AH/9 January 1975 AD) was a prominent Shia scholar and professor of philosophy at the University of Tehran.

Assar moved to Tabriz and began teaching mathematics. It was an unfavorable time for Assar because of the Constitutional Revolution. In the summer of 1908, Moammad Ali Shah attempted a coup against the constitutional government. Tabriz was the main center of opposition to the coup, which was under threat from Russian forces. The Russian army eventually took over the city, and tried and executed several local leaders, including Assar's close associate Mirza Ali Teqat-al-Eslam, who was studying Molla Ṣadra's Asfār with Assar.  

Assar was ninety at the time of his death. He was buried at the tomb of Abu'l-Fotuh Razi at the Shah Abd-al-Azim shrine in south Tehran.

References

Iranian Shia scholars of Islam
1880s births
1975 deaths
Year of birth uncertain